Iniistius auropunctatus is a species of marine ray-finned fish from the family Labridae, the wrasses. It is found in the Eastern Central Pacific.  

References

auropunctatus
Taxa named by John Ernest Randall 
Taxa named by John L. Earle
Taxa named by David Ross Robertson
Fish described in 2002